Pseudocyphellaria glabra is a species of corticolous (bark-dwelling), foliose lichen in the family Peltigeraceae. It has a pale-green upper thallus surface, a white medulla and white pseudocyphellae (tiny pores for gas exchange).

Distribution
Pseudocyphellaria glabra has a disjunct distribution that is separated by the Tasman Sea and the Pacific Ocean. The lichen is found in southeastern Australia (including Tasmania), New Zealand, Argentina, Chile, Lord Howe Island, Macquarie Island, and the subantarctic islands of New Zealand. Population genomic analyses suggest that lichens from these different locations are genetically distinct, but regular long-distance dispersal of spores during the Quaternary probably prevented the local populations from evolving into distinct species.

Taxonomy
The lichen was first formally described in 1844 by Joseph Dalton Hooker and Thomas Taylor as a member of the genus Sticta. Their original report recorded occurrences from the Auckland Islands, Campbell Islands, Falkland Islands, Cape Horn, and Van Diemen's Land (modern-day Tasmania). Carroll William Dodge transferred the taxon to the genus Pseudocyphellaria in 1948. It has acquired many synonyms in its taxonomic history.

Ecology
Arthonia pseudocyphellariae is a lichenicolous fungus that has been recorded parasitising Pseudocyphellaria glabra.

References

glabra
Lichen species
Lichens described in 1844
Lichens of the subantarctic islands
Lichens of Australia
Lichens of New Zealand
Lichens of Argentina
Lichens of Chile
Taxa named by Joseph Dalton Hooker
Taxa named by Thomas Taylor (botanist)